Clara Leticia Rojas González (born December 20, 1964) is a Colombian lawyer, university lecturer, and campaign manager for former senator and presidential candidate Ingrid Betancourt. She was kidnapped along with Betancourt by the FARC guerrilla group near San Vicente del Caguán on February 23, 2002, while Betancourt was campaigning for the presidency. After the kidnapping, Rojas was named as Betancourt's vice-presidential candidate.

In 2006, it was revealed that Rojas had given birth to a boy named Emmanuel while in captivity. The father is a FARC guerrilla.

Rojas had last been seen publicly in a video released by the guerrilla group in 2003. However, on January 10, 2008, Rojas and former congresswoman Consuelo González were freed after six years in captivity. Betancourt was rescued on July 2, 2008.

Operation Emmanuel 

On December 27, 2007, the FARC guerrilla group was said to be planning the imminent release of Rojas, together with her son and congresswoman Consuelo González, in a one-sided prisoner release negotiated by Venezuelan president Hugo Chávez.

Chavez planned their release in an operation dubbed Operation Emmanuel, using Venezuelan aircraft and with the support of the Red Cross.

Delay
The FARC delayed the release of the hostages because the child, Emmanuel, was missing. According to reports, the FARC had placed the child in custody of a peasant family, and he could not be found in time for the scheduled hostage release. In the meantime, the Colombian government learned that a child fitting Emmanuel's description was in the custody of the Colombian Institute for Family Welfare (ICBF) on December 31, 2007. On January 2, 2008, the government called the FARC's bluff and verified that the child was Emmanuel. Subsequently, on January 4, according to the Colombian government, the child was subjected to a mitochondrial DNA test. According to the Institute of Legal Medicine of Colombia, the test verified that he is in fact Clara Rojas' son. FARC subsequently confirmed this. Emmanuel had become ill as a baby, and Rojas had allowed her son to be taken to a doctor for care on the condition that he would be returned to her. Instead, he was placed into the care of a peasant who did not know to whom the child belonged.

Release 
After being temporarily suspended, Operation Emmanuel resumed, and on January 10, 2008, a humanitarian commission headed by the International Committee of the Red Cross flew in two Venezuelan helicopters to a location in Colombia that FARC had designated the previous day. Rojas and González were then released to the care of the commission. On January 13, 2008, Rojas was reunited with Emmanuel; it was the first time she had seen her son after being parted from him for more than two years.

Political career
Rojas was a candidate for Congress in Colombia's March 2014 election. She was also a candidate for Vice President at one point.

Memoir
Rojas' ordeal is described in the book "Captive" (2010).

See also 
 Colombian armed conflict
 Humanitarian exchange
 Ingrid Betancourt
 List of solved missing person cases
 Operation Emmanuel

References

External links 
 The New York Times
 Boy Born to Rebel Hostage Shocks War-Weary Colombia
 CNN World edition

1964 births
2000s missing person cases
20th-century Colombian lawyers
Colombian people taken hostage
Colombian women in politics
Colombian women lawyers
Del Rosario University alumni
Formerly missing people
Kidnapped people
Living people
Missing person cases in Colombia
People from Bogotá